"I Won't Give In" is a song by British rock band Asking Alexandria. It was released on 27 May 2015 as the first single from their fourth studio album The Black. It marks the first song featuring new frontman Denis Stoff after the departure of former vocalist Danny Worsnop in January 2015.

Background and lyrics
After former vocalist Danny Worsnop's departure in early 2015, the band have replaced him with Denis Stoff (former member of Make Me Famous and Down & Dirty). Bruce has stated that the departure of Worsnop was "inevitable" and that Worsnop has no longer cared about the band. The lyrics of this song are believed to be written towards Worsnop as confirmed by guitarist Ben Bruce. Worsnop had a positive response, saying "Glad to hear shit's still going strong".

Music video
The band have released a lyric video for the song on 27 May 2015 on their YouTube channel to announce the new single. On 23 September 2015, the band have released the music video for the song made from footage collected from the band playing Vans Warped Tour.

Personnel
 Denis Stoff – lead vocals
 Ben Bruce – lead guitar, backing vocals
 Cameron Liddell – rhythm guitar
 Sam Bettley – bass
 James Cassells – drums

Charts

References

Asking Alexandria songs
2015 singles
2015 songs
Songs written by Ben Bruce
Sumerian Records singles